Zaida is a town in Midelt Province, Drâa-Tafilalet, Morocco. According to the 2004 census it has a population of 4968.

References

Populated places in Midelt Province